Major-General William Maingay Ozanne  (15 September 1891 − 24 March 1966) was a senior British Army officer.

Military career
Educated at Elizabeth College, Guernsey, Ozanne later entered the  Royal Military College, Sandhurst, from where he was commissioned as a  second lieutenant into the Duke of Wellington's Regiment on 4 March 1911. Among his fellow graduates there were F. C. Roberts and P. H. Hansen, both of whom would later win the Victoria Cross (VC), and C. C. Malden, who would, like Ozanne, become a future general.

He served on the Western Front during the First World War.

He went on to become commanding officer of the 1st Battalion, the Duke of Wellington's Regiment in 1936 and the served in the Second World War as General Officer Commanding of the Norfolk County Division from December 1940, as General Officer Commanding 76th Infantry Division from November 1941 and then performed "special duties" in the War Office from December 1943... He retired from the army in 1946.

References

Bibliography

External links
Generals of World War II

1891 births
1966 deaths
British Army generals of World War II
Companions of the Order of the Bath
Commanders of the Order of the British Empire
Recipients of the Military Cross
Duke of Wellington's Regiment officers
People educated at Elizabeth College, Guernsey
British Army personnel of World War I
Graduates of the Royal Military College, Sandhurst
War Office personnel in World War II
Guernsey people
British Army major generals